Chander Prakash is a former State Minister of Industries of Kashmir. He is a politician of Bharatiya Janata Party. He resigned as a state minister following intense backlash for his attendance of a rally supporting the convicted rapists in the Kathua rape case.

References 

Living people
State cabinet ministers of Jammu and Kashmir
Indian Hindus
Year of birth missing (living people)